Kahar Kalu Muzakkar (born 5 May 1999) is an Indonesian professional footballer who plays as a forward for Liga 1 club PS Barito Putera.

Club career

Barito Putera
Kahar Muzakkar made his first-team debut on 6 March 2020 as a substitute in a match against Bali United. This season was suspended on 27 March 2020 due to the COVID-19 pandemic. The season was abandoned and was declared void on 20 January 2021.

International career
In November 2019, Kahar was named as Indonesia U-20 All Stars squad, to play in U-20 International Cup held in Bali.

Career statistics

Club

Notes

Honours

Individual
 Liga 1 U-20 Top Goalscorer: 2019 (15 goals)

References

External links 
 

1999 births
Living people
Indonesian footballers
Sportspeople from Makassar
Persikota Tangerang players
PS Barito Putera players
Liga 1 (Indonesia) players
Liga 2 (Indonesia) players
Association football forwards
Sportspeople from South Sulawesi